James Paul Burgess (born March 31, 1974) is a former American football linebacker who played two seasons with the San Diego Chargers of the National Football League. He played college football at the University of Miami and attended Homestead High School in Homestead, Florida. He was also a member of the Kansas City Chiefs, Dallas Cowboys, Miami Tropics, Orlando Rage and Calgary Stampeders. Burgess was named to the All-XFL team. His son, James Burgess, currently plays in the NFL.

References

External links
Just Sports Stats

Living people
1974 births
Players of American football from Miami
American football linebackers
Canadian football linebackers
Miami Hurricanes football players
San Diego Chargers players
Orlando Rage players
Calgary Stampeders players
Homestead High School (Homestead, Florida) alumni
Players of Canadian football from Miami